Charles Arthur Floyd (February 3, 1904 – October 22, 1934), nicknamed Pretty Boy Floyd, was an American bank robber. He operated in the West and Central states, and his criminal exploits gained widespread press coverage in the 1930s. He was seen positively by the public because it was believed that during robberies he burned mortgage documents, freeing many people from their debts. He was pursued and killed by a group of Bureau of Investigation (BOI) agents led by Melvin Purvis. Historians have speculated as to which officers were at the event, but accounts document that local officers Robert "Pete" Pyle and George Curran were present at his fatal shooting and also at his embalming. Floyd has continued to be a familiar figure in American popular culture, sometimes seen as notorious, other times portrayed as a tragic figure, even a victim of the hard times of the Great Depression in the United States.

Early life
Floyd was born in Bartow County, Georgia in 1904. His family moved to Akins, Oklahoma in 1911, and he grew up there. He was arrested at age 18 after he stole $350 (Adjusted for inflation would be $6,096.98 in 2022) from a local post office. Three years later, he was arrested for a payroll robbery on September 16, 1925 in St. Louis, Missouri and was sentenced to five years in prison. He served three and a half years before being granted parole.

Floyd entered into partnerships with criminals in the Kansas City underworld after his parole. He committed a series of bank robberies over the next several years, and it was during this period that he acquired the nickname "Pretty Boy," although accounts differ. In one account Orville Drake gave him the name because he would wear a white button-up dress shirt and slacks to work in the oil fields. The men on the rig began calling him "Pretty Boy" which was later turned into "Pretty Boy Floyd". In another account, the payroll master in the 1925 St. Louis Kroger office holdup described one of the robbers as "a pretty boy with apple cheeks". Floyd despised the nickname.

In 1929, Floyd was wanted in numerous cases. On March 9, he was arrested in Kansas City on investigation, and again on May 7 for vagrancy and suspicion of highway robbery, but he was released the next day. Two days later, he was arrested in Pueblo, Colorado and charged with vagrancy. He was fined $50.00 and sentenced to 60 days in jail.

Floyd was arrested in Akron, Ohio on March 8, 1930 under the alias Frank Mitchell and charged with the murder of an Akron police officer who had been killed during a robbery that evening. He was arrested in Toledo, Ohio on suspicion on May 20. He was convicted of a Sylvania Ohio Bank Robbery and sentenced on November 24, 1930 to 12 to 15 years in Ohio State penitentiary, but he escaped.

Floyd was a suspect in the deaths of Kansas City brothers Wally and Boll Ash who were rum-runners, found dead in a burning car on March 25, 1931. Members of his gang killed Patrolman R. H. Castner of Bowling Green, Ohio on April 23. On July 22, Floyd killed federal agent Curtis C. Burke in Kansas City, Missouri.

Former sheriff Erv Kelley of McIntosh County, Oklahoma was shot by Floyd while trying to arrest him on April 7, 1932. In November, three members of Floyd's gang attempted to rob the Farmers and Merchants Bank in Boley, Oklahoma. Despite his life of crime, Floyd was viewed positively by the general public. When he robbed banks, he allegedly destroyed mortgage documents, but this has never been confirmed and may be myth. He was often protected by locals of Oklahoma who referred to him as "Robin Hood of the Cookson Hills".

Kansas City massacre
Floyd and Adam Richetti became the primary suspects in a gunfight known as the "Kansas City massacre" on June 17, 1933 which resulted in the deaths of four law enforcement officers. J. Edgar Hoover leveraged the incident to seek more authority to pursue Floyd, although historians are divided as to whether Floyd was involved. The gunfight was an attack by Vernon Miller and accomplices on lawmen escorting robber Frank "Jelly" Nash to a car parked at the Union Station in Kansas City, Missouri. Kansas City detectives William Grooms and Frank Hermanson, Oklahoma police chief Otto Reed, and special agent Ray Caffrey were killed. Nash was also killed while sitting in the car, shot in the head by his would-be rescuers. Two other Kansas City police officers survived by slumping forward in the back seat and feigning death. As the gunmen inspected the car, another officer responded from the station and fired at them, forcing them to flee. Miller was found dead on November 27, 1933 outside Detroit, Michigan, having been beaten and strangled.

Floyd and Richetti were allegedly Miller's accomplices. Factors weighing against them included their apparent presence in Kansas City at the time, eyewitness identifications (which have been contested), Richetti's fingerprint recovered from a beer bottle at Miller's hideout, an underworld account naming Floyd and Richetti as the gunmen, and Hoover's firm advocacy of their guilt. Fellow bank robber Alvin Karpis claimed that Floyd confessed involvement. On the other side of the issue, the bandit alleged to have been Floyd was supposed to have been wounded by a gunshot to the shoulder in the attack, and Floyd's body showed no sign of this injury when examined later. The underworld account identifying Floyd and Richetti as the killers was offset by equally unreliable underworld accounts proclaiming their innocence. The Floyd family has maintained that Floyd admitted to many other crimes but vehemently denied involvement in this one, as did Richetti.

Kansas City police received a postcard dated June 30, 1933 from Springfield, Missouri which read: "Dear Sirs - I - Charles Floyd - want it made known that I did not participate in the massacre of officers at Kansas City. Charles Floyd". The police department believed the note to be genuine. Floyd also reportedly denied involvement in the massacre to the agents who had fatally wounded him. In addition, a 2002 book on the massacre attributes at least some of the killing to friendly fire by a lawman who was unfamiliar with his weapon, based on ballistic tests.

Death
The BOI named Floyd "Public Enemy No. 1" on July 23, 1934, following the death of John Dillinger. Local police and BOI agents led by Melvin Purvis shot Floyd on October 22, 1934 in a corn field in East Liverpool, Ohio. Accounts differ on who shot him and the manner in which he was killed. 

Floyd and Richetti had left Buffalo, New York on October 18, and their vehicle slid into a telephone pole in heavy fog. No one was injured, but the car was disabled, so they sent two female companions to get a tow truck. They planned to have the women accompany the tow truck driver into town and have the vehicle repaired while they waited by the roadside.

After dawn on October 19, motorist Joe Fryman and his son-in-law David O'Hanlon passed by, observing two men dressed in suits lying by the roadside. They thought it suspicious and informed Wellsville, Ohio police chief John H. Fultz. Fultz investigated with officers Grover Potts and William Erwin. Richetti saw the lawmen and fled into the woods, pursued by two officers, while Fultz went towards Floyd. Floyd immediately drew his gun and fired, and he and Fultz engaged one another in a gunfight, during which Fultz was wounded in the foot and Potts was wounded in the right shoulder, before Floyd fled into the forest. After enlisting the help of another local police officer, Chester C. Smith (February 14, 1895 – October 23, 1984), who had served as a sniper during World War I,  the group of lawmen resumed the pursuit and successfully apprehended Richetti, Floyd however remained on the run. News of the search quickly spread, local police in the surrounding areas were mobilized and a team of BOI agents was quickly dispatched.

On October 22, Floyd was able to hitch a ride to an East Liverpool, Ohio neighborhood where he was able to obtain food at a pool hall owned by a friend of his, Charles Joy. Three separate, divergent accounts exist as to the events that followed: one given by a group of BOI agents who responded, one given by local law enforcement officers and another provided by accounts of civilians present in the area at the time. Where all sides agree is that Floyd was confronted by a group of lawmen soon after leaving the pool hall, that upon realizing he had been spotted Floyd attempted to flee on foot but was shot down by pursuing officers who arrested the wounded Floyd. It is agreed that Floyd was formally placed in federal custody, and initially survived despite being injured from a disputed number of gunshots fired by several disputed lawmen in a highly disputed sequence.  

According to the FBI (as the BOI was known after its name was changed to the Federal Bureau of Investigation in 1935), their agents alone participated in the final confrontation and that local law enforcement arrived only after the final confrontation with Floyd. 
According to FBI accounts, four BOI agents, Samuel K. McKee, Jr., David E. Hall, and Winfred E. Hopton led by Purvis and four members of the East Liverpool Police Department, Herman H. Roth, Jr., Chester C. Smith, and Glenn G. Montgomery, led by Chief Hugh McDermott were searching the area south of Clarkson, Ohio in two cars. They spotted a car move from behind a corn crib and then move back. Floyd then emerged from the car and drew a .45 caliber pistol, and the BOI agents opened fire. Floyd reportedly said, "I'm done for. You've hit me twice." 

However, a news report from the time states, Floyd crawled out of the corncrib toward the Dyke automobile and then changed direction toward a wooded ridge. Purvis yelled “Halt” but Floyd ran. Purvis called out “Fire” and Floyd was mortally wounded by four bullets. Handcuffs were placed on his wrists. Floyd asked: “Who the hell tipped you?”. Floyd refused to answer Purvis's questions about the Kansas City Massacre but did say “I am Floyd… Where is Eddie?” [referring to Adam Richetti]. Thinking he had been shot twice he remarked “You got me twice”. Purvis did not disclose Floyd's last words. Allegedly four days before Floyd and two accomplices had robbed a bank of $500; Floyd’s share of his last bank robbery was $120.00. Among Floyd's effects found on him was a watch and a fob. Each had ten notches, allegedly for ten persons Floyd had killed.

Retired East Liverpool police captain Chester Smith described events differently in a 1979 issue of TIME magazine. He was credited with shooting Floyd first, and he stated that he had deliberately wounded Floyd but not killed him. "I knew Purvis couldn't hit him, so I dropped him with two shots from my .32 Winchester rifle." According to Smith's account, Floyd fell and did not regain his footing, and Smith then disarmed him. At that point, Purvis ran up and ordered, "Back away from that man. I want to talk to him." Purvis questioned Floyd briefly and received curses in reply, so he ordered agent Herman Hollis to "fire into him." Hollis then shot Floyd at point-blank range with a sub-machine gun, killing him. The interviewer asked if there was a cover-up by the FBI, and Smith responded: "Sure was, because they didn't want it to get out that he'd been killed that way."

FBI agent Winfred E. Hopton disputed Smith's claim in a letter to the editors of TIME, published in the November 19, 1979 issue. He stated that he was one of four BOI agents present when Floyd was killed on a farm several miles from East Liverpool. According to Hopton, members of the East Liverpool police department arrived only after Floyd was already mortally wounded. He also claimed that, when the four agents confronted Floyd, he turned to fire on them, and two of the four killed him almost instantly. Smith's account said that Herman Hollis shot the wounded Floyd on Purvis's order, but Hopton claimed that Hollis was not even present.  At least one other source discredits Smith's version, stating that although Smith's story received wide currency, Hollis was not at the orchard that afternoon. Hollis' FBI profile does not mention his participation in this incident. Hopton also stated that Floyd's body was transported back to East Liverpool in Hopton's own car.

Floyd's body was embalmed and briefly viewed at the Sturgis Funeral Home in East Liverpool, Ohio before being sent on to Oklahoma. His body was placed on public display in Sallisaw, Oklahoma. His funeral was attended by between 20,000 and 40,000 people and remains the largest funeral in Oklahoma history. He was buried in Akins, Oklahoma.

Popular portrayals

Woody Guthrie wrote a protest song romanticizing Floyd's life in 1939 called "Pretty Boy Floyd" which recounted Floyd's supposed generosity to the poor. It compared foreclosing bankers to outlaws, calling both actions robbery. Guthrie's song has been subsequently covered by many recording artists.

Dick Tracy's adversary Flattop Jones was based on Pretty Boy Floyd. Flattop claims to be a freelancer from the "Crookston Hills", a parody of Cookson Hills in Oklahoma, and the comic strip refers to Flattop's involvement in the Kansas City Massacre.

Several films have been made about Floyd:
 John Ericson portrayed him in Pretty Boy Floyd (1960), directed by Herbert J. Leder
 Fabian Forte portrayed him in A Bullet for Pretty Boy (1970)
 Steve Kanaly portrayed him in the Film Dillinger (1973)
 Martin Sheen portrayed him in the TV movie The Story of Pretty Boy Floyd (1974)
 Bo Hopkins portrayed him in the TV movie The Kansas City Massacre (1975)
 Andrew Robinson portrayed him in the film The Verne Miller Story (1987) starring Scott Glenn as Vernon Miller
 Channing Tatum portrayed him in Public Enemies (2009) starring Christian Bale and Johnny Depp, in which he is falsely depicted as being killed before John Dillinger

Pretty Boy Floyd (1995) is a fictionalized account of Floyd's life by Larry McMurtry and Diana Ossana.

Floyd is (along with Baby Face Nelson and Machine Gun Kelly) one of the main characters of the comic book series Pretty, Baby, Machine.

See also

 George Birdwell
 List of Depression-era outlaws

References

Further reading
 King, Jeffrey. 1998. "The Life and Death of Pretty Boy Floyd" Atlas Books; 
 Steinbeck, John. 1939. The Grapes of Wrath. John Steinbeck Centennial Edition (1902-2002). Penguin Books, New York. 
 
 "Sister of infamous gunslinger 'Pretty Boy Floyd' recalls a kindly brother," Associated Press; May 14, 2002
 
 
 McMurtry, Larry and Ossana, Diana, "Pretty Boy Floyd," Simon & Schuster;  (historical fiction)
 Michael Wallis, "Pretty Boy, the Life and Times of Charles Arthur Floyd" St. Martin's Press, New York, 1992; 
 Merle Clayton Union Station Massacre 1975 BM Bobbs Merrill

External links
 Kansas City Massacre FBI History
  Woody Guthrie pages, which in turn rely on the liner notes for Bobby Barnett, American Heroes & Western Legends, Bear Family Records (BCD 16 121 AH), 1997
 Sturgis House, East Liverpool, Ohio
 Shootout in Bixby
 Legendary Lawman Killed By Pretty Boy Floyd
 Task Force led by Sheriff Kelly
 Legendary Sheriff Tracks Down Pretty Boy Floyd, But Killed During Shootout
 Death of Pretty Boy Floyd – Crime Library
 Floyd, Charles Arthur – Encyclopedia of Oklahoma History and Culture
 
 Public Enemies in Nevada Pretty Boy Floyd in Reno, Nevada
 
 

1904 births
1934 deaths
American bank robbers
Articles containing video clips
Burials in Oklahoma
Deaths by firearm in Ohio
Depression-era gangsters
People from Adairsville, Georgia
People shot dead by law enforcement officers in the United States